Alessandro Pedro Ribeiro nickname Fumaça (born 16 June 1985 in Perdigão, Minas Gerais) is a Brazilian football striker playing with Swedish club Sollefteå GIF.

He previously played with Brazilian clubs Noroeste and Juventus Minasnovense before moving in 2006 to Croatia to play for NK Croatia Sesvete in the Prva HNL. Until 2009 he had several loan spells with Druga HNL teams such as NK Križevci, NK HAŠK and NK Marsonia 1909. In summer 2009 he signed with Swedish Junsele IF where he played the following 6 months. During 2010 he played with Friska Viljor FC before moving by the end of the year to Sollefteå GIF.

References

External links
 CBF
 Alessandro at ogol.com.br

1985 births
Living people
Brazilian footballers
Brazilian expatriate footballers
Association football forwards
Sportspeople from Minas Gerais